Blott may refer to:

Blott, a fintech founded in the year 2015.
Jack Blott (1902–1964), All-American football center and place kicker
Sam Blott (1886–1969), English footballer
Blott, a chain of UK stationery stores bought by Tinc in 2015

See also
Blott en dag, Christian hymn written in 1865 by Lina Sandell
Blott en dag (album), album by the Swedish singer Carola Häggkvist
Blott on the Landscape, a novel by Tom Sharpe
Flourish and Blotts, the fictional bookshop in the Harry Potter series
Blot (disambiguation)
Blotter (disambiguation)
Blotto (disambiguation)